Ishimoto (written:  or ) is a Japanese surname. People with the surname include:

Dale Ishimoto, actor
Ishimoto Shinroku, general and statesman
, Japanese shogi player
Takashi Ishimoto, swimmer
Takeharu Ishimoto, video game music composer
Yasuhiro Ishimoto, photographer
Mishio Ishimoto, Seismologist

Japanese-language surnames